Bony may refer to:

 Adjective relating to bone

People
 Bony Pierre (born 1991), Haitian footballer
 Jean-François Bony (1754-1825), French silk manufacturer
 Jean-Yves Bony (born 1955), French politician
 Oscar Bony (1941–2002), artist
 Wilfried Bony (born 1988), Ivorian footballer
 Jean-Michel Bony (born 1942), French mathematician

Organizations
 Bank of New York

Places
 Bony, Aisne, France, a commune of the Aisne département
 Bőny, a village in Hungary

Entertainment
 Bony (character), the main character in Arthur Upfield's novels
 Bony (TV series), a 1992 Australian television series starring Cameron Daddo
 Bony (film), a 2021 Indian Bengali film

See also
 Boney (disambiguation)